Henry Newton (born 18 February 1944) is an English former football midfielder, who made almost 500 league appearances for Football League teams during the 1960s and 1970s.

He started at his home town club Nottingham Forest and played 282 League matches for them. In total he made 315 senior appearances for them, scoring 15 goals, and he was at the club when they finished runners-up in the Football League First Division in 1966-67.

He left the club in 1970 to join Everton and played his first game for the "Toffees" on 17 October 1970. He was to make 85 senior appearances and score 6 goals for them before moving to Derby County, his last game for the club coming in September 1973.

Newton made over 100 League appearances at Derby before finishing his career at Walsall. At Derby he was part of the team that won the First Division in 1975.

Newton was capped by the England under-23 side on four occasions, making his debut on 25 November 1964 against Romania. Newton also played for the Football League XI in 1970, in a match against the Scottish League XI.

References 

English footballers
England under-23 international footballers
English Football League players
Nottingham Forest F.C. players
Everton F.C. players
Derby County F.C. players
Walsall F.C. players
Living people
1944 births
Footballers from Nottingham
Association football midfielders